This is a list of mayors and intendants of the city of Columbus, Georgia since its founding in 1828.


Intendants
 Ulysess S. Lewis (1828)
 James Van Ness (1829)
 Sowell Woolfork (1830)
 Samuel Lawhorn (1831)
 Allen Lawhon (1832–1834)
 James C. Watson (1835)

Mayors
 John Fontaine (1836–1837)
 James S. Calhoun (1838–1839)
 George D. McDougal (1840)
 W.H. Harper (1841)
 John L. Lewis (1842–1843)
 Jacob I. Moses (1844)
 L.B. Moody (1845)
 Hohn G. Winters (1846–1847)
 Wiley Williams (1848)
 S.W. Flournoy (1849–1850)
 Willis S. Holstead (1851–1852)
 J.L. Morton (1853)
 John E. Bacon (1854)
 Wiley Williams (1855)
 F.G. Wilkins (1856–1860)
 W.S. Holstead (1861)
 D.B. Thompson (1862)
 John F. Bozeman (1864)
 F.G. Wilkins (1864 – May 1868)
 Capt. William Mills, 16th U.S. Infantry (May 1868-April 1869), Military Reconstruction
 John McIlhenny (April 1869 – 1870)
 S.B. Cleghorn (1871)
 John McIlhenny (1872)
 S.B. Cleghorn (1873)
 John McIlhenny (1874–1876)
 S.G. Cleghorn (1877)
 F.G. Wilkins (1878–1881)
 Cliff B. Grimes (1882–1889)
 D.P. Dozier (1890–1891)
 J.J. Slade (1892–1895)
 Cliff B. Grimes (1896–1897)
 L.H. Chappell (1898–1907)
 Rhodes Browne (1908–1911)
 L.H. Chappell (1912–1913)
 John C. Cook (1914–1916)
 D.L. Parmer (1917–1919)
 Joe L. Couch (1920–1921)
 J. Homer Dimon (1922–1931)
 H.C. Smith (1932–1934)
 J. Homer Dimon (1935)
 Luther Clinton Wilson (1936–1938)
 James Barton Knight, Jr. (1939)
 Edward Murrah (1940–1942)
 W.G. Bridges (1943)
 Sterling Albrecht (1944–1946)
 Walter A. Richards (1947–1949)
 Ralph A. Sayers (1950)
 B.F. Register (1951–1952)
 Lawrence Shields (1953)
 Ralph A. Sayers (1954)
 C. Ed Berry (1955)
 Robert T. Davis (1956)
 B.F. Register (1957–1959)
 B. Ed Johnson (1960–1961)
 Steve Knight (1962)
 Harold E. Hughes (1963–1965)
 B. Ed Johnson (1965–1969), first full-time Mayor elected by voters
 J.R. Allen (1969 – February 1973)
 A.J. McClung (February–April 1973)
 Bob D. Hydrick (April 1973 – 1975)
 Jack P. Mickle (1975–1979)
 Harry C. Jackson (1979–1983)
 J.W. Feighner (1983–1987)
 James E. Jernigan (1987–1991)
 Frank K. Martin (1991–1995)
 Bobby G. Peters (1995–2003)
 Robert Poydasheff (2003–2007)
 Jim Wetherington (2007–2011)
 Teresa Tomlinson (2011–2019), first female mayor
 Berry “Skip” Henderson (2019-present)

See also
 Timeline of Columbus, Georgia

References
 Historical List of Mayors, columbusga.org; retrieved January 2011

External links
 Columbus Mayor's Office

Columbus, Georgia